Ophiurina are a suborder of brittle stars containing the majority of living brittle star species.

Systematics
There is currently no consensus as to the subdivision of the Ophiurina (traditionally, the infraorders have been treated as suborders).  It contains the genera Amphiura, Amphipholis, and Ophiacantha.

The suborder has been divided into the following recent infraorders and families

Ophiacanthidae
Hemieuryalina
Hemieuryalidae
Chilophiurina
Ophiuridae
Gnathophiurina
Amphilepididae
Amphiuridae
Ophiothricidae
Ophiactidae
Ophionereididae
Ophiocomidae
Ophiodermatina
Ophiochitonidae
Ophiodermatidae
Ophiolepidina
Ophiolepididae

References

Ophiurida